Here are the episodes of the webseries Out with Dad.

Season 1 
Season one aired from July 7, 2010 to October 6, 2010 and consists of 8 episodes. All episodes were written and directed by Jason Leaver, original music by Adrian Ellis.

Season 2 
Season two aired from July 7, 2011 to July 12, 2012 and consists of 12 episodes. All episodes were written and directed by Jason Leaver, original music by Adrian Ellis.

Season 3 
Season 3 aired from December 6, 2013 to September 2014 and consisted¿ of 22 episodes. It sees a change in the main role of Nathan, as Jonathan Robbins steps into the role.

Season 4

Season 5

External links 
 Official website
 Watch all episodes Seasons 1 to 3
 Season 4
 Season 5

Lists of Canadian television series episodes